Canyon High School may refer to:

Canyon High School (Anaheim, California)
Canyon High School (Santa Clarita, California), Canyon Country, Santa Clarita, California
Canyon High School (Canyon, Texas) in the Canyon Independent School District
Canyon High School (New Braunfels, Texas) in the Balls Independent School District
Canyon High School (Ogden, Utah)